Artem Eduardovich Novikov (born 13 January 1987) is a Kyrgyzstani politician who served as the First Deputy Chairman of the Cabinet of Ministers from 5 May to 20 May 2021. Prior to this, he served as the First Deputy Prime Minister, as well as the acting Prime Minister of Kyrgyzstan as Sadyr Japarov's official powers in office were suspended pending the results of the January 2021 presidential election.

Early life and education
He was born on 13 January 1987 in the city of Frunze, the capital of the Kirghiz SSR. In 2007 he graduated from the Leningrad Mechanical Institute with a degree in economics.

Career

After returning to Kyrgyzstan in 2008, he was an intern and translator in the investment policy department of the Ministry of Economic Development and Trade of the Kyrgyz Republic. Then he became the chief specialist of the investment policy department of the Ministry of Economic Development and Trade. From 2011-2012, Novikov was an adviser to the then Prime Minister Omurbek Babanov and in 2014-2015 he was an adviser to Prime Minister Djoomart Otorbaev. In May 2017, he was appointed head of the department for financial and economic analysis and development monitoring of the Office of the President of the Kyrgyz Republic. In 2017-2018, Novikov served as the Minister of Economy. In January 2020, he was appointed adviser to Prime Minister Mukhammedkaly Abylgaziev, then adviser to Kubatbek Boronov, who replaced him. On 14 October, he became the country's First Deputy Prime Minister, serving as part of the interim government formed after the protests that month. After the suspension of the official powers of the Prime Minister Sadyr Japarov on 14 November 2020, in connection with his participation in the early presidential elections in Kyrgyzstan scheduled for January, 2021, Novikov became Acting Prime Minister of Kyrgyzstan.

Personal life
He is an ethnic Russian, the 5th ethnic Russian to be a Prime Minister of Kyrgyzstan. In February 2018, the government allocated 36,000 soms for a three-month course in the Kyrgyz language for Novikov. Novikov himself stated that because Russian is an official state language, he had no reason to study Kyrgyz before. In addition to Russian, he speaks English and German. He managed in learning Kyrgyz as well, and has shown in public to be able to speak Kyrgyz fluently.

Since September 2021, he has been an honorary senior lieutenant in the Kyrgyz Army.

See also
List of leaders of Kyrgyzstan
President of Kyrgyzstan
Vice President of Kyrgyzstan
 2020 Kyrgyz parliamentary election
 2020 interim government of Kyrgyzstan
 2020 Kyrgyzstani protests

References

External links
 Government of Kyrgyzstan official site
 Parliament of Kyrgyzstan official site

1987 births
Prime Ministers of Kyrgyzstan
Living people
People from Issyk-Kul Region
Kyrgyzstani people of Russian descent